The Russian National Greco-Roman Wrestling Championships 2015 also known as the Russian Greco-Roman Nationals 2015 was held in Saint Petersburg, Leningrad Oblast, Russia, from 10–11 March 2015.

Medal overview

Medal table

Men's Greco-Roman

See also

2015 Russian National Freestyle Wrestling Championships

References

External links 
 http://www.wrestrus.ru/turnirs/184
 http://wrestlingua.com/Greco-Roman-wrestling/5210-chempionat-rossii-po-greko-rimskoy-borbe-2015-smotret-video-onlayn.html

2015 in Russian sport
2015 in Saint Petersburg
2015 in sport wrestling
Greco-Roman wrestling
March 2015 sports events in Russia
Sports competitions in Saint Petersburg
Wrestling competitions in Russia